The Melrose Historic District is a  U.S. historic district  in Melrose, Florida that was listed on the National Register of Historic Places in 1990. It is bounded by Seminole Ridge Road, Grove Street, South Street, Quail Street, and Melrose Bay. In 1990 it contained 65 contributing buildings and one contributing site, and 21 non-contributing buildings.

It is located in Alachua and Putnam counties.

See also
Trinity Episcopal Church (Melrose, Florida)

References

External links
 Florida's Office of Cultural and Historical Programs - Alachua County
 Historic Markers in Alachua County

Alachua County architectural survey: Waldo, Archer, Melrose et cetera, 1973:
Alachua County survey of historic buildings and architecture - photos, description, history, owners, valuations, condition, general reports especially valuable for original owner information and succeeding owners. In Melrose approximately 42 buildings described - see Melrose pages 26–68 of 94 total pages. University of Florida Dept. or Architecture. . http://ufdc.ufl.edu/UF00103201/00001/1x?search=melrose

National Register of Historic Places in Alachua County, Florida
National Register of Historic Places in Putnam County, Florida
Historic districts on the National Register of Historic Places in Florida